İsaqlıgirmə (also, Isakhlygirme and Isaklygirmya) is a village in the Balakan Rayon of Azerbaijan.  The village forms part of the municipality of Şambul.

References 

Populated places in Balakan District